One and Four (originally titled Yige he sige) is a 2021 Tibetan thriller film directed by Jigme Trinley, starring Jinpa, Wang Zheng, Kunde and Darggye Tenzin.

Cast
 Jinpa as Sanggye
 Wang Zheng as The Tall Guy
 Kunde as Kunbo
 Darggye Tenzin as The Short Guy
 Tsemdo as a dead cop

Release
The film premiered at the Tokyo International Film Festival on 2 November 2021.

Reception
Jessica Kiang of Variety wrote that the film is "at times more a filmmaking exercise than a fully formed film, it’s because underneath all the impressive craft there’s not a whole lot of substance. But the texture is so convincing you can almost overlook that emptiness, especially when it’s all done with a sly wink and a mordant sense of mischief." Elizabeth Kerr of The Hollywood Reporter wrote that the film is "an efficient and visually engaging, if slightly familiar, tale of modern encroachment on the natural world and the violence it can bring." Kurt Halfyard of ScreenAnarchy wrote that while the film "appears not quite up to the difficult task of tangling and untangling itself", it "still remains an admirable first feature."

References

External links
 
 

2021 thriller films